Falling Forward is the audio companion to Sandi Patty's autobiographical book of the same name presenting a collection of the singer's Christian pop songs.

Track listings
 "Made Me Glad" - 5:28
 "Sing to the King" - 4:43
 "Falling Forward" - 4:11
 Sweeter Medley: "Sweeter" / "Blessed Be Your Name" / "You Are Good" - 4:54
 "Step into the Joy" - 3:18
 "In My Heart" - 4:37
 "Found" - 4:09
 Sandi's Medley: "Upon This Rock" / "In the Name of the Lord" / "Who Will Call Him King of Kings?" - 5:43
 "You Call Me Yours" - 5:08
 "Grace Flows Down" (with daughter Jenn Helvering) - 4:52

Awards

In 2008, the album was nominated for a Dove Award for Inspirational Album of the Year at the 39th GMA Dove Awards.

Personnel 
 Sandi Patty – vocals
 David Hamilton – acoustic piano, Hammond B3 organ, synthesizers, programming, track and vocal arrangements, orchestra arrangements and conductor 
 Tyrone Dickerson – Hammond B3 organ (5)
 Mark Baldwin – acoustic guitar, electric guitar, nylon-string guitar
 David Cleveland – acoustic guitar, electric guitar
 Craig Nelson – bass 
 Dan Needham – drums
 Eric Darken – percussion
 Sam Levine – alto saxophone, tenor saxophone
 Jimmy Bowland – baritone saxophone
 Roy Agee – trombone
 Vinnie Ciesielski – trumpet 
 Steve Patrick – trumpet
 Lloyd Barry – horn arrangements 
 Nashville String Machine – orchestra 
 Dave Williamson – string arrangements 
 Ric Domenico – music director 
 Eberhard Ramm – music director 
 Angela Cruz – backing vocals (1, 2, 4, 8)
 Sherry Carter – backing vocals (1, 2, 4, 8)
 Ronnie Freeman – backing vocals (1, 2, 4, 8)
 Tammy Jensen – backing vocals (1, 2, 4, 8)
 Jaimee Paul – backing vocals (1, 2, 4, 8)
 Nirva Ready – backing vocals (1, 2, 4, 5, 8)
 Chance Scoggins – backing vocals (1, 2, 4, 8), BGV leader (1, 2, 4, 8)
 Michelle Swift – backing vocals (1, 2, 4)
 Terry White – backing vocals (1, 2, 4, 8)
 Melinda Doolittle – backing vocals (5)
 Peter Penrose – backing vocals (5)
 Jenn Helvering – vocals (10)

Choir
 Jenn Helvering, Lisa Huff, Amy Rouse, Jay Rouse, Sarah Scharborough, Ricky Vale, Steve Williamson and Jennifer Wilson

Production
 Mike Atkins – executive producer 
 Jeff Moseley – executive producer 
 David Hamilton – producer, additional recording, digital editing 
 Danny Duncan – rhythm track recording 
 David Beano – vocal recording, musical assistance, digital editing
 David Hill – vocal recording, BGV recording 
 David Schober – orchestra recording
 Jeff Aebi – musical assistance
 Jeff Cain – musical assistance, digital editing 
 Scott Kidd – musical assistance
 Tom Reeves – musical assistance
 Ronnie Brookshire – mixing 
 Jim Cooley – mix assistant 
 Juan Portera – digital editing, production assistant 
 Andrew Mendelson – mastering at Georgetown Masters (Nashville, Tennessee)
 James Rueger – A&R 
 Derek West – A&R
 Ken "Snakehips" Johnson & His West Indian Dance Orchestra – production coordination
 Hans Nelson – production assistant  
 Dana Salcedo – creative director, stylist 
 Ben Arrowood – design 
 Russ Harrington – photography

Chart performance

References

2007 albums
Sandi Patty albums